The Belgian Fourth Division was the lowest nationwide division in Belgian football. The division was split into four separate leagues, A, B, C and D.  The team with the most points in the four leagues together was declared the overall winner.  If several league winners had the same number of points, the one with the most wins was declared champion, or if that was still tied, then the one with the best goal average was declared champion.  Finally, if two teams were still equal, a single match was played on a neutral ground to determine the team to be added to the palmares. For 2016–17 the Belgian Fourth Division was replaced by the Belgian Third Amateur Division.

The competition
The competition consisted of the regular season of 30 matchdays and the promotion playoff of three matchdays.

The regular season
The four champions qualified directly for the Belgian Third Division.  Each league was split into three periods (of 10 matchdays each) which determined the twelve qualifiers for the promotion playoff.  If a team needed to be replaced, the best-placed team at the end of the regular season which had not yet qualified for the playoff took the free spot.  A winner of a period could be replaced because:
it had won more than one period;
the champion had won at least one period;
it finished in 13th place;
it was relegated to the level below.

The bottom three teams in each league were relegated to the provincial leagues while the 13th-placed teams entered the interprovincial playoff.

As a part of changes in the Belgian league system that were implemented in 2016, the Belgian Fourth Division was replaced by the Belgian Third Amateur Division.

Fourth Division playoff
The Fourth Division playoff was played in three rounds.  The first round consisted of six matches of one leg opposing the twelve qualifiers from the Fourth Division.  Two teams from the third division (the two 14th-placed teams) entered the playoff in the second round that consisted of two groups of two matches.  The third division teams were placed in different groups (with three teams from the first round in each group).  The two winners of each group played the group final that qualified two teams for the third division.  The groups were constructed to ensure that the two teams from the third division were not able to meet each other in the playoff.  The matches were played in one leg at the venue of the first drawn team.  When a match ended in a draw, extra time of two periods of 15 minutes was played followed by a penalty shootout if the score remained tied.

Past winners

See also
Belgian Fourth Division A
Belgian Fourth Division B
Belgian Fourth Division C
Belgian Fourth Division D

References

External links
 Belgian FA official website – Organisation of the Fourth Division
 Sport.be website – Fixtures, results, standings and stats

 
Sports leagues established in 1952
1952 establishments in Belgium
2016 disestablishments in Belgium
Defunct fourth level football leagues in Europe